Five ancient Greek novels survive complete from antiquity: Chariton's Callirhoe (mid 1st century), Achilles Tatius' Leucippe and Clitophon (early 2nd century), Longus' Daphnis and Chloe  (2nd century), Xenophon of Ephesus' Ephesian Tale (late 2nd century), and Heliodorus of Emesa's Aethiopica (3rd century). There are also numerous fragments preserved on papyrus or in quotations, and summaries in Bibliotheca by Photius, a 9th-century Ecumenical Patriarch. The titles of over twenty such ancient Greek romance novels are known, but most of them have only survived in an incomplete, fragmentary form. The unattributed Metiochus and Parthenope may be preserved by what appears to be a faithful Persian translation by the poet Unsuri. The Greek novel as a genre began in the first century CE, and flourished in the first four centuries; it is thus a product of the Roman Empire. The exact relationship between the Greek novel and the Latin novels of Petronius and Apuleius is debated, but both Roman writers are thought by most scholars to have been aware of and to some extent influenced by the Greek novels.

Genre  
Most scholars agree that the five surviving Greek novels constitute a coherent if flexible genre, but no name for this genre is known from antiquity. Contemporary literary critics usually omit the extended prose narratives of antiquity from discussions of the novel. There are no clear distinctions of genre between the five 'romantic' novels and other works of Greek prose fiction, such as Lucian's True Story, the Alexander Romance and the Aesop Romance.

B.P. Reardon has the following qualifications to define a novel "narrative fiction in prose—imaginative, creative literature, sufficiently similar to what we call novels to justify the term here". This definition allows him to extend the category to include, in addition to the five canon novels, Pseudo-Lucian's The Ass, Lucian's  A True Story, Pseudo-Callisthenes' Alexander Romance, and the anonymously written The Story of Apollonius, King of Tyre.

Although the plots of the surviving novels appear to be relatively conventional, entailing the fulfilled heterosexual desire of a beautiful and usually virtuous young couple, this impression of uniformity and moralism may be an illusion created by later Christians, who decided which to copy for posterity. Writers now lost such as Lollianus (the author of Phoenician Tales) and Iamblichus seem to have been much more experimental and lurid. Even so, the surviving texts (arguably with the exception of Xenophon's Ephesian Tale) show great sophistication in their handling of character, narrative and intertextuality. 

Two stories included by Reardon in his list of novels have survived only as summaries: Antonius Diogenes's The Wonders Beyond Thule and Iamblichus' Babylonian History.  Both of these summaries are the work of Photios in his Bibliotheca.

Influences 
The influence of the novelists is demonstrable on Musaeus' Hero and Leander, the late antique epic by Nonnus titled  Dionysiaca, Procopius, the Byzantine novel, and Byzantine historiography in general. Thanks in large part to Jacques Amyot's translations, they were rediscovered in early modern Europe, and played an influential role in the formation of the modern novel, particularly the 'romance' variety.

References

Bibliography

 .
 B. P. Reardon Collected Ancient Greek Novels (Berkeley: University of California Press, 2008)
 G. Schmeling ed. The Novel in the Ancient World, 2nd ed. (Leiden: Brill, 2003)
 T. Whitmarsh ed. The Cambridge Companion to the Greek and Roman Novel (Cambridge: Cambridge University Press, 2008)

 
Ancient Greek literature